Rich Kids is the fifth extended play by Australian singer-songwriter, Washington. It was released in May 2010.

The EP debuted and peaked at number 70 on the ARIA Charts.

Track listing

Charts

References 

2010 EPs
EPs by Australian artists
Megan Washington albums